Isidre is a Catalan male given name. Notable people with this name include:

 Isidre Bonsoms i Sicart (1849–1922), Catalan bibliophile and cervantist
 Isidre Codina, Spanish football manager
 Isidre Molas (born 1940), Catalan politician and historian
 Isidre Nonell (1872–1911), Spanish artist
 Isidre Puig Boada (1891–1987), Spanish Catalan architect